is a 2015 Japanese film, featuring a crossover between the casts and characters of the Super Sentai television series Ressha Sentai ToQger and Zyuden Sentai Kyoryuger, including the debut appearance of the main cast of Shuriken Sentai Ninninger. Kyaeen's Hiroyuki Amano guest stars. It was released nationally in Japan on January 17, 2015.

Story
Lady of the Galaxy Line informs the ToQgers that a strange energy is heading its way to Earth as it sends a Galaxy Line terminal crashing to Earth. The ToQgers investigate, finding themselves fighting a group of Cambrima and Zorima before the main five members of the Kyoryugers save them from the Deboth Army grunts. Noticing how long it has been since they fought together, the Kyoryugers take over the fight and defeat the Deboth Army minions before learning the Galaxy Line terminal is surrounded by a barrier. The Ressha arrives and Daigo, able to see it despite being an adult due, is given a special pass. Once in the Ressha, Daigo reveals the figure who created around the terminal to be the one who created his team's enemy Deboth: Creator Devius. Furthermore, Daigo explains that Devius is siphoning the Galaxy Line terminal's energy and that his team have a chance to stop him before he reaches full power to destroy Earth. Though Right offers his aid, Daigo turns down the ToQgers' help as they are unable to fight the Deboth Army and advises them to leave this to him and his team. At Castle Terminal, Crimson High Priest Salamazu appears before Emperor Z to set up an alliance between the Shadow Line and Devius.

While waiting for a train, Utsusemimaru finds himself facing Clock Shadow and a group of Close before Akira arrives to aid the Kyoryuger. The two sixth-member Sentai warriors transform to fight Clock Shadow as the rest of the ToQgers arrives. The only one who knows Clock Shadow's power to de-age people with his singing voice, ToQ 6gou summons the Build Ressha to get his team and Kyoryu Gold away from Clock Shadow, who then finds himself surrounded by the unorthodox Shuriken Sentai Ninninger team, who drives him away. But Clock Shadow succeeds in restoring the ToQgers to their child forms while turning Utsusemimaru into a baby. After being driven back by Salamazu and the Shadow line, the Kyoryugers meet with the ToQgers as the latter discuss a team-up despite Daigo's refusal to her children involved. Before Right explains it is no different than before, the groups are ambushed by Clock Shadow the Close and Zorima. Despite the Kyoryugers' intent to protect the children, the ToQgers transform and exchange their ToQ Ressha with the Kyoryugers' Zyudenchi so the Sentai teams can combine their Imagination and Brave to defeat the grunts.

But after dissolving his partnership with the Shadow Line to steal their darkness to complete Devius's power up, Salamazu appears and absorbs Clock Shadow and the remaining grunts before he transforms into a giant box train worn by five giant Close. Kyoryuzin, ToQ-Oh and Build DaiOh face Salamazu before forming Gigant Kyoryuzin with Ressha and ToQ Rainbow with Zyudenchi to defeat their enemy while the ToQgers and Utsusemimaru return to their adult status. However, the victory is short-lived as Devius appears and proceeds to use the darkness Salamazu gave him to overwhelm the Sentai teams with the Kyoryugers injured. Later, at the Hyper Ressha Terminal, the ToQgers understand that they may need to fight Devius on their own as the Zyudenryu left their Zyudenchi in the terminal. Daigo, overhearing the ToQgers' discussion about protecting their families, understands them a bit better. The next morning, the Conductor, Ticket, and Wagon have gathered in the office of the President of the Rainbow Line where they meet the spirit of Torin. With Torin's cooperation, they were able to combine the giant Zyudenchi to create a Brave Zyudenchi. The attack plan is for the other ToQgers to hold off Devius' defenses when the Red Ressha gets the Brave Zyudenchi to the barrier to breakthrough.

While the others contend with Cryners and revived Shadow Creeps, ToQ 1gou reaches the terminal and faces Devius before being overwhelmed. Things seem bleak until Kyoryu Red arrives to ToQ 1gou's aid while the other Kyoryugers aid the ToQgers. After Devius achieves full power, ToQ 1gou and Kyoryu Red assume their Hyper ToQ 1gou and Kyoryu Red Carnival forms to defeat him with a Gabutyra Ressha before escaping the cave-in. But Devius is revealed to have survived as he emerges as a giant to wipe out the two Sentai teams. However, the ToQgers find unexpected help from the Shadow Line, who want revenge on Devius's treachery, along with the other Kyoryugers that Canderrilla and Luckyuro called last night. The three groups proceed to clip Devius's wings before destroying him for good. Later, the ToQgers say their goodbyes to the Kyoryugers with Daigo wishing them the best of luck at getting home someday.

Cast
: , 
: , 
: , 
: , 
: , 
: 
: 
: 
: 
: 
: 
: , 
: 
: 
:

Voice cast
: 
: 
: 
: 
, ToQger Equipment Voice: 
: 
: 
: 
: 
, Cryner and Castle Terminal Announcements: 
: 
: 
: 
: 
: 
: 
: 
: 
: 
: 
: 
: 
Kyoryuger Equipment Voice: 
Ninninger Equipment Voice:

Reception
The film has earned  at the Japanese box office.

References

External links
(In Japanese)

2010s Super Sentai films
Crossover tokusatsu films
2015 films
Films scored by Toshihiko Sahashi